Eubranchus inabai is a species of sea slug or nudibranch, a marine gastropod mollusc in the family Eubranchidae.

Distribution
This species was described from Mukaishima, Seto Inland Sea, Japan. It has been reported from Hong Kong and Tuncurry, New South Wales, Eastern Australia.

References

Eubranchidae
Gastropods described in 1964